Eucalyptus × brachyphylla is a mallee or small tree that is endemic to a small area in Western Australia. It has rough bark near the base of the trunk, smooth greyish bark above, egg-shaped to elliptic adult leaves, flower buds in groups of seven in leaf axils, white flowers and conical fruit.

Description
The lower part of the trunk is rough with partly shed strips of greyish bark but the upper trunk and branches have smooth bronze-coloured and dark grey bark. The smaller branches are glaucous (covered with a pale, powdery bloom). Flowering occurs in June and between August and September and the flowers are white.

Taxonomy and naming
Eucalyptus brachyphylla was first formally described in 1943 by Charles Gardner from a specimen collected near Lake Cowan by George Brockway. In 1996 Peter Grayling and Ian Brooker proposed that E. brachyphylla is a hybrid between E. kruseana and E. loxophleba and this interpretation is accepted by the Australian Plant Census. The specific epithet (brachyphylla) is from the Ancient Greek  brachys meaning "short" and phyllon meaning "leaf".

Distribution and habitat
This eucalypt is only known from near Kalgoorlie, Cardunia Rock north of Karonie and Widgiemooltha where it usually grows near granite outcrops in undulating country.

Conservation
Eucalyptus × brachyphylla is classified as "Priority Four" by the Government of Western Australia Department of Parks and Wildlife, meaning that is rare or near threatened.

References

brachyphylla
Endemic flora of Western Australia
Plant nothospecies
Mallees (habit)
Myrtales of Australia
Eucalypts of Western Australia
Goldfields-Esperance
Vulnerable flora of Australia
Plants described in 1943
Taxa named by Charles Gardner